Ratchford may refer to:

People
 C. Brice Ratchford (1920–1997), American academic
 Jeremy Ratchford (born 1965), Canadian actor
 Michael D. Ratchford (1860–1927), American trade unionist
 Michael Ratchford (politician) (fl. 1992), American academic
 Stefan Ratchford (born 1988), English rugby league player
 William R. Ratchford (1934–2011), American politician

Places
 Ratchford, Ohio, U.S.
 Ratchford Range, a mountain range in Canada

See also